Basdeo Khera is a village in Hilauli block of Unnao district, Uttar Pradesh, India. As of 2011, its population is 103, in 22 households, and it has one primary school and no healthcare facilities.

The 1961 census recorded Basdeo Khera as comprising 1 hamlet, with a total population of 25 (8 male and 17 female), in 5 households and 5 physical houses. The area of the village was given as 130 acres.

References

Villages in Unnao district